Macu or MACU may refer to:

 Macu, the name of several ethnic groups and languages of South America
 Macu, The Policeman's Woman, a 1987 Venezuelan film
 Mid-Atlantic Christian University, in North Carolina, United States
 Mid-America Christian University, in Oklahoma, United States
Mountain America Credit Union, in Utah, United States

See also 
 Maccu, a Sicilian soup
 Macou (disambiguation)
 Maku (disambiguation)